Cumberland is a village in Saint Vincent and the Grenadines. It is located in the west of the main island of Saint Vincent, between the towns of Barrouallie and Chateaubelair, and just to the south of the small settlement of Troumaka.

References

Populated places in Saint Vincent and the Grenadines